Ellen Barry is New England Bureau Chief of The New York Times. She was the paper's Chief International Correspondent from 2017 to 2019, and South Asia Bureau Chief in New Delhi, India, from 2013 to 2017. Previously she was its Moscow Bureau Chief from March 2011 to August 2013.

Early life and education
Ellen Barry was born on April 11, 1971, in Tarrytown, New York.

Barry is a 1993 graduate of Yale University with a B.A. in English, where she was also a reporter and editor for the Yale Daily News. At Yale, she won the Wallace Non-Fiction Prize and the Wright Memorial Prize for best essay by a senior in 1993.

Career
Ellen Barry began her career as a journalist in 1993 when she was a managing board member of the Yale Daily News. From 1993 to 1995, Barry worked for The Moscow Times as a staff reporter. In 1996 she began working for the Boston Phoenix as a feature writer. In 1999 she began working for The Boston Globe. In the years of 2004 to 2006, Barry worked as the Atlanta bureau chief for the Los Angeles Times. She joined The New York Times as a Metro reporter in January 2007 and became the Moscow correspondent for The Times in June 2008.

Awards and recognition
In 2010 Barry and her Times colleague Clifford J. Levy won a George Polk Award and the Pulitzer Prize for their reporting on "corruption and abuse of power in Russia" for the "Above the Law" series.

She was a Pulitzer Prize finalist in 2002 for feature writing and won the American Society of Newspaper Editors Distinguished Writing Award for Non-Deadline Writing. In 2004 she was a Pulitzer Prize finalist for beat reporting on mental health. In 2020 she was a Pulitzer Prize finalist for feature writing for "The Jungle Prince of Delhi".

References

External links
 Official Twitter account Ellen Barry
 "Above the Law" series, The New York Times
 The Jungle Prince of Delhi, The New York Times
 A Maine Paper Mill's Unexpected Savior: China
 "Year of Dead Eyes" , The New York Times

The New York Times writers
Pulitzer Prize for International Reporting winners
Living people
American women journalists
Yale College alumni
1971 births
21st-century American women
The Moscow Times